The South American Championship of Champions was a football competition played in Santiago, Chile in 1948 and the first continental-wide football tournament in South America. Hosted and organized by Chilean club Colo-Colo, with the aid of then president of CONMEBOL Luis Valenzuela, it was played between February 11 and March 17. Brazil's Vasco da Gama won the competition after earning the most points in the round-robin tournament.

This tournament is seen as the precursor to the Copa Libertadores and is considered, along with the Copa Aldao (also named "Copa Río de La Plata"), as an important stepping stone towards its creation.

Overview 

Since the early 1910s, Argentine and Uruguayan clubs disputed the Copa Aldao, a tournament played between the national champions of each nation's top national leagues. The great success of this tournament gave birth to the idea of a continental competition.

In 1929, the head executives of Nacional, Roberto Espil and José Usera Bermúdez, idealized a competition between the national champions of each Conmebol member. After analyzing the geographical distributions and distances, Espil devised a project in 1946 which also included the runners-up of every national league. However, it was in 1948 that Colo-Colo's head executive, Robinson Alvarez Marín, and CONMEBOL president, Luis Valenzuela, finally set into motion the forerunner of the Copa Libertadores: the "South American Championship of Champions", the first ever tournament played in order to determine the champion club of South America. 

Vasco da Gama, led by figures such as Augusto, Barbosa, Danilo, Friaça, Ademir and Chico, came away with the trophy after a deciding 0–0 draw against River Plate on the last round of matches. The Argentine squad had arrived in Santiago with most of players of legendary team La Máquina such as José Manuel Moreno, Ángel Labruna and Félix Loustau, with the addition of rising star Alfredo Di Stéfano.

Vasco da Gama had already defeated Lítoral and Emelec 1–0 each, thumped Nacional 3–1, trashed Municipal 4–0 and tied 1–1 with the host club Colo-Colo. The competition was as successful financially as it was on the field: the average public attendance per game was 39,549 spectators and the tournament generated a gross of CLP 9,493,483.

The tournament was also the kickoff to the creation of the European Cup in Europe. French journalist Jacques Ferran became fascinated with the tournament. The UEFA document on the history of the European Cup confirms that Jacques Ferran and Gabriel Hanot, journalists for the French sports newspaper L'Equipe, were the founding fathers of the European Cup. In interviews to the Brazilian sports TV programme Globo Esporte in 2015 and Chilean newspaper El Mercúrio in 2018, Jacques Ferran said that the South American Championship of Champions was the inspiration for the European Cup: "How could Europe, which wanted to be ahead of the rest of the world, not be able to accomplish a competition of the same kind of the South American one? We needed to follow that example."

Participants 
The aim of the organizers was to invite the champion of the most important competition of each South American country. Most notable in the competition were the host Colo-Colo, the Alfredo Di Stéfano-inspired River Plate (La Máquina), the Atilio García-inspired Nacional, and Vasco da Gama, the respective representatives of Chile, Argentina, Uruguay and Brazil, four countries whose clubs would go on to become the dominant powers of South American football, aggregately winning all Copa Libertadores from 1960 to 1978 and over 90% of the Copa Libertadores from 1960 to the present day.

Notes:

Additional notes:
 No organized club championship existed then in Colombia (that would eventually be commenced still in 1948, but later that year, in August, whereas the South American Club Championship was held in Feb-Mar 1948). 
 No reason is clear about the absence of a Paraguayan, though the 1947 Paraguayan Civil War may possibly have been the reason. 
 Venezuela would become a party to CONMEBOL only in 1952, 4 years after the South American Club Championship.

Notable players 
Players who were considered big names at the time participated in the tournament: Angel Labruna, Felix Loustau, Norberto Yácono, Alfredo Di Stefano, Jose Manuel Moreno and Nestor Rossi for River Plate; Chico and goalkeeper Moacir Barbosa Nascimento for Vasco da Gama; José Santamaría at the age of 19 was part of the Nacional Montevideo squad, which Luis Volpi had joined a year earlier after a short spell with Inter Milan.

Final standings

Match results 
Complete list of matches played in the tournament:

Top scorers  
List of the competition top scorers:

Acknowledgment as a forerunner to Copa Libertadores 

Vasco da Gama, though always considered themselves the first South American champions, had never asked Conmebol for acknowledgment of that honor. However, in 1996 a Conmebol book, 30 Años de Pasión y Fiesta (30 Years of Passion and Party) was discovered by Vasco da Gama executives. This book told the story of the Copa Libertadores (played from 1960 on), stating that the tournament of 1948 was its antecedente (predecessor). According to the Conmebol Press Release of April 29th, 1996,  Vasco da Gama's executives asked Conmebol's Executive Committee for the acknowledgment of the aforementioned honor, and the acceptance of Vasco da Gama as a participant at Supercopa. 

In April 1996, Conmebol's Executive Committee acknowledged the meaning and importance of the 1948 competition as the precursor to the Copa Libertadores (though Conmebol has not come to regard it as an official Conmebol competition), thus Vasco da Gama participated at the 1997 Supercopa Libertadores, former Conmebol competition to which were admitted only the previous Copa Libertadores champions (with Supercopa Libertadores not admitting the participation of winners of other official Conmebol competitions, such as Copa Conmebol).  As stated by the Conmebol Executive Committee, Vasco da Gama's request for Supercopa participation was accepted "in acknowledgment of the sporting achievement and its historical truth" (as written in the 1996 Conmebol press release on the aforementioned acknowledgment). In 2014, Conmebol congratulated Vasco da Gama on the club's 116th anniversary, stating: "Vasco won the first tournament of clubs at a continental level in 1948, which would 12 years later become the Copa Libertadores which they won in 1998, coinciding with the centenary of their founding."

See also 
 Copa Libertadores

References

1948 in South American football
Defunct international club association football competitions in South America
International club association football competitions hosted by Chile
Club Atlético River Plate matches
CR Vasco da Gama matches
February 1948 sports events in South America
March 1948 sports events in South America
1948 in Chilean sport
1940s in Santiago, Chile